Two total lunar eclipses occurred in 1986: 

 24 April 1986 lunar eclipse
 17 October 1986 lunar eclipse

See also 
 List of 20th-century lunar eclipses
 Lists of lunar eclipses